TPTHK [The Promise That Heaven Kept] is the first studio album by Canadian recording artist Promise, it was released on August 8, 2002. The album features guest appearances from Sean Slaughter, Aion Clarke fka Voyce Alexander and others. The album was released by independent record label DFS Records.

Track listing

Personnel
Executive producers: Dan Johnson
Co-executive producers: Andrew James and Promise Shepherd
Recording: Andrew James and Promise
Mastering and Mastering: DFS Records, Toronto
Art Direction, Design and Photography: Melanie Greenwood, Vision City

Awards
2002 CGMA Covenant Award for Hip-Hop/Rap Song of the Year for "Alright"

References

2002 albums
Promise (rapper) albums